The Itaipava Arena Fonte Nova, also known as Complexo Esportivo Cultural Professor Octávio Mangabeira, is a football-specific stadium located in Salvador, Bahia, Brazil, and has a maximum capacity of 48,000 people. The stadium was built in place of the older Estádio Fonte Nova.

The stadium was first used for the 2013 FIFA Confederations Cup and the subsequent 2014 FIFA World Cup, including the 5–1 win of The Netherlands over reigning World Champions Spain.  It was used as one of the venues for the football competition of the 2016 Summer Olympics.

A group of architects from Brunswick, Germany, which also redesigned the old Hanover stadium into a modern arena for the 2006 Cup, was selected after bidding. Since 2013, the brewery Itaipava from Grupo Petrópolis has the naming rights of the arena "Itaipava Arena Fonte Nova" under a sponsorship agreement until the year 2023, amounting to $100m. This was the first naming rights agreement signed for the 2014 World Cup stadiums.

The stadium was inaugurated on April 7, 2013, with a Campeonato Baiano game in which Vitória defeated Bahia 5–1. The first player to score a goal in the stadium was Vitória's Renato Cajá. During this match, some supporters were unable to see the game completely due to some blind spots. The stadium had excessive dust and some puddles. The company responsible for the stadium, owned by Grupo OAS and Odebrecht, said it was aware of the problems.

On May 27, 2013 a section of the roof collapsed after heavy rain.

Football games

2013 FIFA Confederations Cup

2014 FIFA World Cup

2016 Summer Olympics - Men's Football

2016 Summer Olympics - Women's Football

2019 Copa América

Brazil national football team

References

External links

Official Website 
Bid inspection report

Football venues in Bahia
Sports venues in Salvador, Bahia
Venues of the 2016 Summer Olympics
Olympic football venues
2014 FIFA World Cup stadiums
Sports venues completed in 2013
2013 FIFA Confederations Cup stadiums
2013 establishments in Brazil